Burkhard Driest (28 April 1939 – 27 February 2020) was a German actor, writer and director, known for his acting work in Sam Peckinpah's Cross of Iron and Rainer Werner Fassbinder's Querelle. He also wrote novels and screenplays.

Life 
Driest was born in Stettin, Germany (now Poland), on 28 April 1939, the son of a graduate economist and a piano teacher. At the end of World War II, the family fled to Peine,  Lower Saxony. His parents were divorced in 1950. The children stayed with the mother, who moved to Göttingen, but he returned to his father in 1957. In an anthology from 1995, Driest described his memories of childhood and adolescence under the title Halbstark in Peine. He was dismissed from school four times but achieved the Abitur as the third-best of that year.

Driest studied law for ten semesters in Kiel, Berlin and Göttingen. On 11 May 1965, three weeks before his oral law examination, he robbed the savings bank in Burgdorf. He was sentenced to five years in prison and released after three years and four months. He then worked in the port of Hamburg, and as a waiter and taxi driver in London. He published his first novel, Die Verrohung des Franz Blum (The brutalization of Franz Blum), with autobiographical aspects, in 1974. He wrote the screenplay for a 1974 film of the same name, directed by Reinhard Hauff, with Jürgen Prochnow in the title role, and Driest in a minor role. Peter Zadek invited him to play the role of Stanley Kowalski in Endstation Sehnsucht (A Streetcar Named Desire) by Tennessee Williams, with Rosel Zech as Blanche, at the Schauspielhaus Bochum. The same year, Driest was a guest on Dietmar Schönherr's talk show, with Romy Schneider and Bubi Scholz. During this live appearance, Schneider touched Driest's arm, saying "Sie gefallen mir! Sie gefallen mir sehr!" (I like you! I like you a lot!) in words from a recent  popular film in which Schneider had starred. The incident won him increased attention.

Driest worked with directors such as Werner Herzog (for Stroszek), Sam Peckinpah (for Cross of Iron), and Reinhard Hauff on four projects. He wrote together with Lukas Heller the script for the satire , which premiered in 1978 but was a failure with critics and the audience.

Driest wrote versions of the screenplay for Rainer Werner Fassbinder's final film, Querelle, but they were not accepted. He played the role of Mario, alongside Jeanne Moreau and Brad Davis. Driest wrote texts for the Peter Zadek's musical Andi and revue Falco meets Amadeus at the Theater des Westens. Driest lived in Switzerland after 1983, working as an actor and producer. He wrote a detective novel published in 2003 and also worked as an artist.

Personal life
Driest was married three times. His daughter is the writer . He died in Berlin on 27 February 2020 at age 80 after a long illness.

Filmography
Driest worked in films as an actor, screenwriter, director and producer, including:

As actor
1974:  - Walter 'Tiger' Kuul
1976: Der Kommissar: Der Held des Tages (TV series episode) - Hartmut Stimmel
1977: Cross of Iron - Schütze Maag
1977: Stroszek - Souteneur
1978:  - Gerd Müller
1980:  - Nick Dellmann
1982: Querelle - Mario
1983: The Roaring Fifties - Major Assimov
1984: Die Story
1984: Der Havarist - Sterling Hayden
1984: Smaragd - Klopfer Martin
1985: Kalt in Kolumbien
1986: Kir Royal (TV series, 1 episode) - Schläger
1987: Taxi nach Kairo - 1. Polizist
1990: Ein Fall für zwei: Madonna (TV series episode) - Malik
1992: Den demokratiske terroristen - Horst
1997: Der Ausbruch (TV film) - Peter Stolzek
1998:  - Lasinger
2000: I Love You, Baby - Decker
2003: Hamlet_X - Observer
2009: Lasko – Die Faust Gottes (TV series, 4 episodes) - Abt Patrizius
2011: Toni Costa: Kommissar auf Ibiza - Der rote Regen (TV series episode) - El Cubano (final film role)

As screenwriter
1974: Die Verrohung des Franz Blum, script based on his own novel of the same name

1978: Son of Hitler
1980: Slow Attack
1982: Querelle
1984:     

As director  
1984: 

As producer     
1978: Son of Hitler

1982: Querelle

Other works 
Works by Driest are held by the German National Library, including:

Novels
 1974: Die Verrohung des Franz Blum, Rowohlt, Reinbek
 1981: Mann ohne Schatten
 1997: Sanfte Morde
 2003: Der rote Regen
 2005: Liebestod
 2006: Brennende Schuld
 2008: Sommernachtsmord
 2010: Küchenkunst, LangenMüller, Munchen
 2011: Die Maikäfer und der Krieg (Roman), LangenMüller, München

References

External links 
 
 
 
 Burkhard Driest deutsches-filmhaus.de
 Schauspieler und Autor Burkhard Driest ist tot

1939 births
2020 deaths
Writers from Szczecin
German male film actors
20th-century German male actors
People from the Province of Pomerania
21st-century German male actors
German screenwriters
German male screenwriters
Actors from Szczecin
Film people from Szczecin